Kevin Cloud is an American video game artist. He graduated from LSU-Shreveport in 1987 with a degree in political science. Cloud acquired his first full-time job as a computer artist at Softdisk in 1985. He was hired by id Software on March 10, 1992 to work as an assistant artist to lead artist Adrian Carmack, where he remained to work on popular computer games such as Wolfenstein 3D, Doom, and Quake, climbing the ranks of the company. Prior to his career at id, he was employed by Softdisk as an editorial director, where several other id founders worked. During that time he also worked as an illustrator for Softdisk's Commodore 64 disk magazine Loadstar. Cloud was an artist and co-owner of id until the ZeniMax Media merger in 2009, where he now serves as a senior producer.

Works
All games Cloud has worked on were developed by id Software unless stated otherwise.

References

External links
 PlanetQuakeWars.net interview with Kevin Cloud
 Kevin Cloud profile at MobyGames

Id Software people
Living people
Louisiana State University Shreveport alumni
Video game artists
Year of birth missing (living people)